Long Lopeng (also known as Luping) is a settlement in the Lawas division of Sarawak, Malaysia.

The 150 km logging track from Lawas to Ba'kelalan passes through Long Lopeng.
Neighbouring settlements include:

Notable people
Baru Bian

References

Populated places in Sarawak